Mirza'ekber Alimjan (born 28 January 1995) is a Chinese footballer currently playing as a defender for Xinjiang Tianshan Leopard.

Career statistics

Club
.

References

1995 births
Living people
Chinese footballers
Association football defenders
China League Two players
China League One players
Shenyang Dongjin F.C. players
Xinjiang Tianshan Leopard F.C. players